The German Masters was a European Tour men's professional golf tournament played in Germany, and hosted and promoted by Germany's most successful golfer Bernhard Langer and his brother Erwin.

History
Founded in 1987, the tournament was originally played in Stuttgart, moving to Berlin in 1994. Since 1998, it has been held at Golf Club Gut Lärchenhof in Pulheim near Cologne. The prize fund had climbed to €3 million by 2005, making the German Masters one of the richer tournaments on the PGA European Tour at that time outside of the major championships and the three individual World Golf Championships.

After a one-year break in 2006, the tournament returned to the European Tour schedule in 2007, renamed as the Mercedes-Benz Championship. Played as a no-cut event, it had a maximum field of 78, consisting primarily of players who had either won tournaments on the European Tour in 2007 or were in the top 75 of the Official World Golf Rankings or in the top 60 of the European Order of Merit. It was played in mid-September, a slot created by the rescheduling of the HSBC World Match Play Championship to October. However, as it clashed with the PGA Tour's Tour Championship, many leading players were unavailable, and so the prize fund had dropped to €2 million on its return, one third less than it was in 2005.

Winners

Notes

References

External links
Official site
Coverage on the European Tour's official site

Former European Tour events
Golf tournaments in Germany
Recurring sporting events established in 1987
Defunct sports competitions in Germany